Dønna is a municipality in Nordland county, Norway. It is part of the Helgeland region. The administrative centre of the island municipality is the village of Solfjellsjøen. Other villages include Bjørn, Dønnes, Hestad, Sandåker, and Vandve. The main island of Dønna is connected to the neighboring municipality of Herøy to the south by the Åkviksundet Bridge.
 
The  municipality is the 304th largest by area out of the 356 municipalities in Norway. Dønna is the 306th most populous municipality in Norway with a population of 1,369.

General information

Municipal history
The municipality of Dønna was established on 1 January 1962 due to the work of the Schei Committee. The new municipality was created by merging these areas:
the municipality of Nordvik (population: 1,293) 
the part of the municipality of Herøy on the southern tip of the island of Dønna (population: 19)
the part of the municipality of Nesna on the island Løkta (population: 80)
the majority of the municipality of Dønnes (population: 1,348), except for the part located on the island of Tomma.

The borders of Dønna municipality have not changed since that time.

Name
The municipality is named after the island of Dønna. The name is probably derived from the Norse verb dynja which means to "rumble" or "roar" (referring to the swell of the waves on the island).

Coat of arms
The coat of arms was granted on 29 May 1981. The official blazon is "Or a schnecke azure from base sinister to dexter". This means the arms have a field (background) that is divided by a line called a schnecke (a swirling clockwise spiral design that is looks like a wave). The field located above the line has a tincture of Or which means it is commonly colored yellow, but if it is made out of metal, then gold is used. The tincture below the line is blue. 
The arms are a canting symbol for the municipality since the Norwegian word dønning means "wave" or "swell". The arms were designed by Odd Fjordholm.

Churches
The Church of Norway has one parish within the municipality of Dønna. It is part of the Nord-Helgeland prosti (deanery) in the Diocese of Sør-Hålogaland.

Economy
Much of the industry focuses on fishing, aquaculture, and fish processing. There is also some agriculture, tourism, and some public services.

Government
All municipalities in Norway, including Dønna, are responsible for primary education (through 10th grade), outpatient health services, senior citizen services, unemployment and other social services, zoning, economic development, and municipal roads. The municipality is governed by a municipal council of elected representatives, which in turn elect a mayor.  The municipality falls under the Alstahaug District Court and the Hålogaland Court of Appeal.

Municipal council
The municipal council of Dønna is made up of 17 representatives that are elected to four year terms. The party breakdown of the council is as follows:

Mayor
The mayors of Dønna (incomplete list):
2019–present: Nils Jenssen (Sp)
2015-2019: John Erik Skjellnes Johansen (Ap)
2011-2015: Anne Sofie Sand Mathisen (Ap)
2007-2011: Ingunn Laumann (Ap)
2003-2007: Steinar Horsgård (Sp)
1995-2003: Anne Sofie Sand Mathisen (Ap)

Geography
Dønna is located in Outer Helgeland which also consists of the municipalities of Leirfjord, Alstahaug, and Herøy. The municipality is made up of a large archipelago consisting of islands, islets, and reefs. The three largest islands in the municipality are Dønna, Løkta, and Vandve. The Åsværet islands (and the Åsvær Lighthouse) lie in the western part of the municipality. The island municipality is situated at the mouth of the Ranfjorden.

Notable residents

 Gjeble Pederssøn (ca.1490 at Teigstad – 1557) a priest, the first Lutheran bishop in Norway
 Petter Dass (ca.1647 – 1707) a Lutheran priest and poet; (birthplace disputed)
 Erasmus Zahl (1826 in Nordvika – 1900) a privileged trader and figure of the social hierarchy
 Anton Christian Bang (1840 on Dønna – 1913) a theologian, historian and politician; Bishop of Oslo 1896 to 1912
 Fredrikke Tønder-Olsen, (Norwegian Wiki) (1856 on Dønna - 1931) feminist pioneer
 Julius J. Olson (1875 on Dønna – 1955) Minnesota Supreme Court justice
 Ole Edvart Rølvaag (1876 on Dønna – 1931) a Norwegian-American author
 Axel Coldevin (1900 on Dønna – 1992) a Norwegian historian, wrote about trade and industry
 Steinar Bastesen (born 1945 on Dønna) a Norwegian politician, fisherman and whaler
 Roy Jacobsen (born 1954) a novelist and short-story writer, lives periodically on Dønna
 Odd Eriksen (born 1955) a politician, stopped an Algerian hijacker; brought up on Dønna
 Jostein Pedersen (born 1959 in Dønna) a Norwegian musical journalist, reporter and TV commentator

References

External links

Municipal fact sheet from Statistics Norway 
Photos from Dønna 

 
Municipalities of Nordland
1962 establishments in Norway